is a railway station on the Chūō-Sōbu Line in Shinjuku, Tokyo, Japan, operated by the East Japan Railway Company (JR East).

Lines
The station is served by the Chūō-Sōbu Line.

Station layout
The station consists of a single island platform serving two tracks.

Platforms

History
The station opened on 9 October 1894. With the privatization of Japanese National Railways (JNR) on 1 April 1987, the station came under the control of JR East.

Surrounding area
 Keio University Medical School Hospital
 Meiji-Jingu Stadium
 Soka Gakkai Headquarters
 Hall of the Great Vow for Kosen-rufu (Kosen-rufu Daiseido)
 Soka Culture Center
 Soka Gakkai Josei Toda International Centre (Soka Gakkai International Headquarters)
 Soka Young Women's Centre
 Komeito Headquarters
 Seikyo Shimbun Headquarters
 Min-On Music Museum

See also
 List of railway stations in Japan

References

External links

  

Railway stations in Japan opened in 1894
Railway stations in Tokyo
Stations of East Japan Railway Company